Robert Agnew (born December 1, 1953 in Atlantic City, New Jersey) is the Samuel Candler Dobbs Professor of Sociology at Emory University and past-president of the American Society of Criminology.

Education
Agnew received his B.A. with highest honors and highest distinction from Rutgers University in 1975, and his M.A. and Ph.D. from the University of North Carolina at Chapel Hill in, respectively, 1978 and 1980—all in sociology. He joined Emory University in 1980 and served as chairperson of the sociology department from 2006-2009.

Professor Agnew's primary research and teaching interests are criminology and juvenile delinquency, especially criminological theory.  He is well known for his development of general strain theory and was elected Fellow of the American Society of Criminology. He has served on the editorial boards of Criminology, Journal of Crime and Justice, Journal of Research in Crime and Delinquency, Journal of Theoretical and Philosophical Criminology, Justice Quarterly, Social Forces, Theoretical Criminology, Turkish Journal of Criminology, and Youth & Society.

In 2015, Dr. Agnew was awarded the Edwin H. Sutherland Award for his pioneering general strain theory which explains causes behind the crime.

Selected publications

Books
The Future of Anomie Theory. Boston: Northeastern University Press (1997) (edited with Nikos Passas)
Criminological Theory: Past to Present. 3d edition. New York: Oxford University Press (2006) (1st edition 1999) (edited with Francis T. Cullen)
Juvenile Delinquency: Causes and Control. 3d edition. New York: Oxford University Press (2009) (1st edition 2001)
Why Do Criminals Offend? A General Theory of Crime and Delinquency. New York: Oxford University Press (2005)
Pressured Into Crime: An Overview of General Strain Theory. New York: Oxford University Press (2006)
Anomie, Strain and Subcultural Theories of Crime. Burlington, VT: Ashgate (2010) (edited with Joanne Kaufman)
Toward a Unified Criminology: Integrating Assumptions about Crime, People and Society. New York: NYU Press (2011)

Book Chapters
"The contribution of social-psychological strain theory to the explanation of crime and delinquency." Advances in Criminological Theory: The Legacy of Anomie Theory, Volume 6, edited by Freda Adler and William Laufer. New Brunswick, NJ: Transaction (1995)
"Stability and change in crime over the life course: A strain theory explanation." Advances in Criminological Theory: Developmental Theories of Crime and Delinquency, Volume 7, edited by Terence P. Thornberry. New Brunswick, NJ: Transaction (1997)
"A General Strain Theory approach to violence." Violence: From Theory to Research, edited by Margaret A. Zahn, Henry Brownstein, and Shelly L. Jackson. LexisNexis/Anderson Publishing (2005)
"General Strain Theory: Recent developments and directions for further research." Advances in Criminological Theory: Taking Stock: The Status of Criminological Theory, Volume 15, edited by Francis T. Cullen, John Wright, and Michelle Coleman. New Brunswick, NJ: Transaction (2006)
"Revitalizing Merton: General Strain Theory." Advances in Criminological Theory: The Origins of American Criminology, Volume 16, edited by Francis T. Cullen, Freda Adler, Cherl Lero Johnson, and Andrew J. Meyer. New Brunswick, NJ: Transaction (2009)
"Controlling crime: Recommendations from General Strain Theory." Criminology and Public Policy, edited by Hugh B. Barlow and Scott H. Decker. Philadelphia, PA: Temple University Press (2009)

Articles
"A revised strain theory of delinquency." Social Forces 64:151-167 (1985)
"A longitudinal test of the revised strain theory." Journal of Quantitative Criminology 5:373-387 (1989)
"Foundation for a general strain theory of delinquency." Criminology 30:47-87 (1992)
"An empirical test of general strain theory." Criminology 30:475-499 (1992) (with Helene Raskin White)
"A general strain theory of community differences in crime rates." Journal of Research in Crime and Delinquency 36:123-155 (1999)
"Building on the foundation of general strain theory: Specifying the types of strain most likely to lead to crime and delinquency." Journal of Research in Crime and Delinquency 38(4):319-352 (2001)

Technical Reports
The Development of a Risk Assessment Instrument for the DeKalb County Juvenile Court (1992)
A Risk Assessment Instrument for the Fulton County Juvenile Court (1993)

References

Further reading
Baron, Stephen W. "General strain, street youth and crime: A test of Agnew's revised theory." Criminology 42:457-483 (2004)
Brezina, Timothy. "Adapting to strain: An examination of delinquent coping responses." Criminology 34:39-60 (1996)
Broidy, Lisa. "A test of general strain theory." Criminology 39(1):9-34 (2001)
Capowich, George E., Paul Mazerolle and Alex Piquero. "General strain theory, situational anger, and social networks: An assessment of conditioning influences." Journal of Criminal Justice 29:445-461 (2001)
Hay, Carter. "Family strain, gender, and delinquency." Sociological Perspectives 46(1):107-135 (2003)
Hoffmann, John P. and Alan Miller. "A latent variable analysis of general strain theory." Journal of Quantitative Criminology 14(1):83-110 (1998)
Hoffmann, John P. and S. Susan Su. "The conditional effects of stress on delinquency and drug use: A strain theory assessment of sex differences." Journal of Research in Crime and Delinquency 34(1):46-79 (1997)
Hoffmann, John P. and Timothy O. Ireland. "Strain and opportunity structures." Journal of Quantitative Criminology 20(3):263-292 (2004)
Jang, Sung Joon and Byron R. Johnson. "Strain, negative emotions, and deviant coping among African Americans: A test of general strain theory." Journal of Quantitative Criminology 19(1):79-105 (2003)
Mazerolle, Paul. "Gender, general strain, and delinquency: Empirical examination." Justice Quarterly 15(1):65-92 (1998)
Mazerolle, Paul, Velmer S. Burton, Francis T. Cullen, T. David Evans and Gary L.Payne. "Strain, anger, and delinquent adaptations: Specifying general strain theory." Journal of Criminal Justice 28:89-101 (2000)
Mazerolle, Paul and Alex Piquero. "Violent responses to situations of strain: A structural examination of conditioning effects." Violence and Victims 12:323-344 (1997)
Moon, Byong Ook, Merry Morash and Cynthia Perez McCluskey. "A comprehensive test of general strain theory: Key strains, situational and trait-based negative emotions, conditioning factors, and delinquency," Journal of Research in Crime and Delinquency 46(2):182-212 (2009)
Ostrowsky, Michael and Stephen Messner. "Explaining crime for a young adult population: An application of general strain theory." Journal of Criminal Justice 33:463-476 (2005)
Paternoster, Raymond and Paul Mazerolle. "General strain theory and delinquency: A replication and extension." Journal of Research in Crime and Delinquency 31:235-263 (1994)
Piquero, Nicole Leeper and Miriam Sealock. "Generalizing general strain theory: An examination of an offending population." Justice Quarterly 17:449-488 (2000)
Piquero, Nicole Leeper and Miriam Sealock. "Gender and general strain theory: A preliminary test of Broidy and Agnew's gender/GST hypotheses." Justice Quarterly 21(1):125-158 (2004)
Rebellon, Cesar J., Nicole Leeper Piquero, Alex Piquero, and Sherod Thaxton. "Do frustrated economic expectations and objective economic inequity promote crime? A randomized experiment testing Agnew's general strain theory" European Journal of Criminology 6(1):47-71 (2009)

1953 births
Living people
Rutgers University alumni
Emory University faculty
University of North Carolina at Chapel Hill alumni
Presidents of the American Society of Criminology
People from Atlantic City, New Jersey